Alejandra Selma Dueñas Santander (born 11 January 1975), better known as Jani Dueñas, is a Chilean actress and comedian. She is best known for her role as Patana Tufillo Triviño on the children's series 31 Minutos, and for appearing on the Chilevisión program .

Biography

She has appeared on radio, on the programs  and Dueñas de nada on the Internet radio station Molecula.cl.

In 2014, Comedy Central Latin America aired the program Comedy Central Presenta: Stand-up en Chile, hosted by Nicolás Larraín and showing the routines of 14 Chilean comedians, including Dueñas.

In 2016 she presented her one-person stand-up show Ya no somos los mismos at the historic .

From 2017 to 2018 she hosted Dueñas de Salas with Paloma Salas on Big Radio, an online radio station.

In 2017 she recorded a stand-up show called Grandes fracasos de ayer y hoy, which was released on Netflix in mid-2018. The routine was selected by Time magazine as one of the 10 best stand-up comedy specials of the year.

On 26 February 2019 she performed at the 60th Viña del Mar International Song Festival, the same night as singers Marc Anthony and David Bisbal. Her routine was loudly booed by the public, so she had to wrap up the set early.

Political career
In 2016, Dueñas joined Democratic Revolution.

Works

Radio
  (2008–2012), Radio ADN
 Más allá del fútbol (2013), 
 Dueñas de nada (2015), Molécula.cl
 El nuevo taco (2015), 
 Dueñas de Salas (2017–2018), Big Radio

Books
 Gatos gordos, Piscolas y otras voces que me persiguen (2012), Planeta,

Dubbing
 Las vacaciones de Tulio, Patana y el pequeño Tim (2009), Voice: Patana Tufillo
 31 minutos, la película (2008), Voice: Patana Tufillo, Estrella de Lana, and TV commentator
 31 Minutos (2003–2005, 2014), Voice: Patana and others

Actress
 Mitú (2005) as Úrsula
 Es cool (2005) as Susana
  (2004) as Bárbara Céspedes
  (2008) as Lidia

Casting director
 Mitú (2005) 
 31 minutos

Television programs
  (voiceover)
 , Vía X (2005–2006)
  (voiceover)
  (2011–2012)
 Campo minado, Vía X, 2016
 , Chilevisión (voiceover)

References

External links

 
 

1975 births
21st-century Chilean actresses
Chilean telenovela actresses
Chilean women comedians
Living people
Chilean stand-up comedians
Democratic Revolution politicians